The RAPTOR King of Tough 250 is a NASCAR Xfinity Series stock car race held at Atlanta Motor Speedway in Hampton, Georgia, a few miles south of Atlanta. This race had been Atlanta's lone Busch/Nationwide/Xfinity Series date until 2021 when a second race was added in July. Although it has been shuffled around the schedule several times, most years, it has been held at the beginning of the season in February or March.

History

Jeff Gordon, Mike Skinner, Jamie McMurray, and Carl Edwards have gotten their first series wins in this race.

Following the transfer of the season ending Cup series race from Atlanta to Homestead-Miami Speedway after the 2001 season (although due to the September 11 attacks, the 2001 Atlanta fall race was the second-to-last race of the season when the race at New Hampshire was moved from September to November as the last race of the season), the then 312-mile race was moved to Atlanta's fall race weekend where it remained until Aaron's Rental, who was sponsoring the race, chose instead to sponsor the lone Busch event at Talladega. The race gained sponsorship from GlaxoSmithKline through its Nicorette brand and moved back to its traditional spring date.

In September 2008, NASCAR officials announced that Nicorette would not renew its corporate sponsorship for race after the 2008 season. On October 26, 2008 it was announced that Unilever's deodorant brand Degree will take over sponsorship of this race starting in 2009.  It was later announced that the now-Degree V12 300 would be moving to September as part of the latest round of NASCAR realignment, which resulted in the Pep Boys Auto 500, the AMP Energy 500 at Talladega, and the Pepsi 500 at Fontana/Auto Club Speedway trading places. The Degree V12 300 took the place of the Camping World RV Service 300 on NASCAR's Labor Day weekend race schedule and serves as an accompanying race to the AdvoCare 500.

In 2015, the Xfinity race at Atlanta moved along with the Cup race (Folds of Honor QuikTrip 500) to the second weekend of the season and ran as a doubleheader on Saturday afternoon along with the Truck Series. The race was also reduced to 250 miles in order to make the race a doubleheader on the same day.

EchoPark Automotive became the title sponsor of the race in 2020, replacing Rinnai. That year, the race had been moved from being in February and the second race of the season and the first race before the three-race west coast swing to March and as the fifth race of the season as the first race after the west coast swing. However, the race was moved again from March to June due to the COVID-19 pandemic. In 2021, the race returned to March. In 2022, Nalley Automotive Group replaced EchoPark as the title sponsor and the new name of the race was the Nalley Cars 250. In 2023, RAPTOR Coatings replaced Nalley as the title sponsor and the new name of the race was the RAPTOR King of Tough 250.

Past winners

Notes
1993: Race postponed from March due to blizzard.
2004, 2008 and 2022: Races extended due to NASCAR overtime.
2020: Race postponed from March 14 due to the COVID-19 pandemic.

Track length notes
1992-1997: 1.522 mile true oval
1998-present: 1.54 mile quad-oval

Multiple winners (drivers)

Multiple winners (teams)

Manufacturer wins

References

External links
 
 "What's Behind The Aaron's 312?"

1992 establishments in Georgia (U.S. state)
NASCAR Xfinity Series races
 
Recurring sporting events established in 1992
Annual sporting events in the United States